McLean Mill National Historic Site is a steam-operated sawmill on Vancouver Island, officially open to tourists since July 1, 2000.  It was designated a National Historic Site of Canada in 1989.

History
The mill originally ran as a family operated saw-milling business from 1926 to 1965. The original plot of land was purchased by Robert Bartlett ("R.B.") McLean, and he moved there with his wife Cora, and his three sons Arnold, Philip, and Walter.

The business was eventually taken over by Arnold, who then passed on the business to his son Howard McLean, who ran it until its closing in 1965. One of the main reasons for its closing was competition from the larger lumber companies in the area.

Environmental Report: https://www.portalberni.ca/mclean-mill-phase-one-environmental-review-2019

See also 
 Alberni Valley Heritage Network

References

External links
 Alberni Valley Heritage Network

Heritage sites in British Columbia
History of Vancouver Island
National Historic Sites in British Columbia
Museums in British Columbia
Forestry museums in Canada
Alberni Valley
Port Alberni